Prorella opinata is a moth in the family Geometridae first described by Pearsall in 1909. It is found in the US states of Colorado, California, Arizona, New Mexico and Utah.

The wingspan is about 14 mm. Adults are small and gray. The forewings have fine crosslines, the antemedian lines tending at times to fuse into a faint band which runs from the discal dot to the inner margin at about one-fourth. Adults have been recorded on wing in May and from July to October.

References

Moths described in 1909
Eupitheciini